The 1985–86 Eliteserien season was the 29th season of ice hockey in Denmark, and the first season of the Eliteserien. Seven teams participated in the league, and the Rødovre Mighty Bulls won the championship. Hellerup IK was relegated to the 1. division.

First round

Final round

Qualification round

External links
Season on eliteprospects.com

Dan
1985 in Danish sport
1986 in Danish sport